E. J. Mills is an American football coach.  He is the head football coach at Amherst College in Amherst, Massachusetts, a position he has held since 1997.

Head coaching record

Football

References

External links
 Amherst profile

Year of birth missing (living people)
Living people
American softball coaches
Albany Great Danes football coaches
Amherst Mammoths football coaches
Amherst Mammoths softball coaches
Dayton Flyers baseball players
Ramapo Roadrunners football coaches